Farnoldia is a genus of lichenized fungi within the Lecideaceae family.

The genus name of Farnoldia is in honour of Ferdinand Christian Gustav Arnold (1828 - 1901), a German lichenologist and taxonomist born in Ansbach, Bavaria.

References

External links
Farnoldia at Index Fungorum

Lecideales genera
Lichen genera
Lecideales
Taxa named by Hannes Hertel